Eylau is a ghost town in Bowie County, Texas, United States.

History
Collin M. Akin bought land along the river and established Eylau sometime after the Battle of San Jacinto. A post office was established at Eylau in 1885 and remained in operation until 1895. Its population was 30 in 1890. It ceased to exist as a community in 1940.

Geography

Education
A school on Collin M. Akin's land was consolidated with the Sylar School on the M.H. Jones survey in 1886. Today, the community of Eylau is served by the Liberty-Eylau Independent School District.

References

Ghost towns in Texas